DeWolf may refer to:

Places  
Dewolf Point State Park, in New York
Fort DeWolf, American Civil War fort located just south of Shepherdsville, Kentucky

People 
DeWolf family, a prominent Canadian and American family
DeWolf Hopper (1858–1935), American actor

See also
De Wolf, list of people with this surname and variant forms
Canadian Navy Harry DeWolf-class of offshore patrol vessels